Jorge Ubico Castañeda (10 November 1878 – 14 June 1946), nicknamed Number Five or also Central America's Napoleon, was a Guatemalan dictator. A general in the Guatemalan army, he was elected to the presidency in 1931, in an election where he was the only candidate. He continued his predecessors' policies of giving massive concessions to the United Fruit Company and wealthy landowners, as well as supporting their harsh labor practices. Ubico has been described as "one of the most oppressive tyrants Guatemala has ever known" who compared himself to Adolf Hitler. He was removed by a pro-democracy uprising in 1944, which led to the ten-year Guatemalan Revolution.

Early years

Jorge Ubico was the son of Arturo Ubico Urruela, a lawyer and politician of the Guatemalan Liberal Party. Ubico Urruela was a member of the legislature that wrote the Guatemalan Constitution of 1879, and was subsequently the president of the Guatemalan Congress during the government of Manuel Estrada Cabrera (1898–1920). Jorge Ubico was privately tutored, and attended some of Guatemala's most prestigious schools, as well as receiving further education in the United States and Europe.

By 1897 Ubico received his commission into the Guatemalan army as a second lieutenant, a commission which was largely due to his political connections. He rapidly established himself in the army and rose through the ranks, and, after a military campaign against El Salvador, held the rank of colonel at the age of 28. A year later, he was made the governor (jefe politico) of the province of Alta Verapaz, followed four years later as governor of Retalhuleu.

During his tenure, he oversaw improvements in public works, the school system, public health, and youth organizations. In 1918, he drained swamps, ordered fumigation and distributed free medicine to combat a yellow fever epidemic, and won the praise of Major General William C. Gorgas, who had done the same in Panama. However, most of his reputation came from his harsh but effective punishment of banditry and smuggling across the Mexican border.

He returned to Guatemala City in 1921 to participate in a coup that installed General José Orellana into the presidency, after the sitting president Carlos Herrera y Luna refused to ratify the concessions that Estrada Cabrera had made to the United Fruit Company. Under Orellana he was appointed Secretary of War in 1922, but quit a year later. In 1926, after the death of President Orellana, Ubico ran unsuccessfully for president as the candidate of the Political Progressive Party. He temporarily retired to his farm until the next election.

Guatemalan instability

In December 1930, President Lazaro Chacón was forced to resign after having a stroke. By that time, Guatemala was in the midst of the Great Depression and bankrupt; Chacón's successor, Baudilio Palma, was deposed by a coup d'état after only four days in office and was replaced by Gral. Manuel María Orellana.  The United States opposed the new government and demanded Orellana resign; he was forced to leave the presidency in favor of José María Reina Andrade.

Election 
The Liberal Party allied with the Progressives to nominate Ubico as Andrade's successor, in an election where Ubico was the only candidate on the ballot. In February 1931 he was elected with 305,841 votes. In his inaugural address, he pledged a "march toward civilization". Once in office, he began a campaign of efficiency which included assuming dictatorial powers.

Government

Military dictatorship 
Ubico's rule has been characterized as totalitarian; John Gunther, who visited the country during 1941, described Guatemala as "a country 100 per cent dominated by a single man." Added Gunther: "He [Ubico] has spies and agents everywhere, and knows everyone's private business to an amazing degree. Not a pin drops in Guatemala without his knowing it." Guatemala under Ubico was likened to "a modern jail."

He militarized numerous political and social institutions—including the post office, schools, and symphony orchestras—and placed military officers in charge of many government posts. He frequently traveled around the country performing "inspections" in dress uniform followed by a military escort, a mobile radio station, an official biographer, and cabinet members.

UFCO and relations with the US 
Ubico considered Guatemala to be the closest ally of the United States in Central America. Adopting a pro-USA stance to promote economic development and recovery from depression, the United Fruit Company under Ubico became the most important company in Guatemala. It received import duty and real estate tax exemptions from the government and controlled more land than any other group or individual. It also controlled the sole railroad in the country, the sole facilities capable of producing electricity, and the port facilities at Puerto Barrios on the Atlantic coast.

Relations with Germany 

As part of a goodwill worldwide tour promoting the Berlin 1936 Summer Olympics, in January of that year the German light cruiser Emden arrived to Guatemala. Its crew travelled by train to Guatemala City where they paraded in front of Ubico's Army staff and the general public.

Middle class 
While the middle class grew substantially during Ubico's regime, the basic character of the regime remained oligarchical and his regime primarily benefited the landowning class. The country's middle class, resentful of its exclusion from the government, later spearheaded the democratic revolution that removed Ubico from power.

Napoleon 
Ubico considered himself to be "another Napoleon". He admired Napoleon Bonaparte extravagantly and preferred to have his photograph taken in his general's uniform. Although he was much taller and fatter than his hero, Ubico believed that he resembled Bonaparte, and his nickname was "the Little Napoleon of the Tropics". He dressed ostentatiously and surrounded himself with statues and paintings of Napoleon, regularly commenting on the similarities between their appearances.

Anti-corruption 

Despite his dictatorship, Ubico was commended by both his defenders and his detractors for his personal integrity and for virtually eliminating corruption in Guatemala; anyone found guilty of corruption was "instantly" and "severely" punished. The so-called Probity Law mandated that all public officials publicly declare their assets before taking office and upon leaving it – and the law was rigorously enforced.

Repression and controversy

Police chief embezzlement accusation
On 18 September 1934, Efraín Aguilar Fuentes, Juventino Sánchez, Humberto Molina Santiago, Rafael Estrada Guilles, and Colonel Luis Ortiz Guzmán were tortured and executed inside the Guatemala National Penitenciary, accused of planning a plot to overthrow president Ubico.

In his book The paradox garden, written in 1935, Guatemalan writer Efraín De los Ríos accused the police chief, General Roderico Anzueto Valencia, of making up the plot to get rid of the accused conspirators. According to De los Ríos, this is what really happened:

In early September 1934, when Ubico announced a popular referendum to determine whether he should extend his presidential term for another six years, the lawyer Efraín Aguilar Fuentes, the Property Registry director, sternly declined to be in favor of the president. When Ubico summoned him to the  presidential office to chastise him, Fuentes coldly replied he was aware Police Chief Anzueto Valencia had embezzled up to twenty eight properties and therefore he, Aguilar, was not going to support the president.  But he did not know that Anzueto was only the front man and the real owner was Ubico himself.

In the following weeks, Anzueto Valencia made up a list of people involved in a false plot to murder Ubico Castañeda, and among the people in the list he included Aguilar Fuentes. All the people on the list were imprisoned, tortured  and forced to confess. Their "confessions" appeared in the semi-official newspaper El Liberal Progresista.

De los Ríos was incarcerated once the government learned about these strong accusations. He remained in the National Penitenciary for most of the rest of Ubico's presidency.

Congress gift 
In 1940, the Guatemalan Congress gave Ubico a gift of US$200,000. Nearly 90 people were jailed for criticizing the gift.

Resignation and continuation

Ubico's repressive policies and arrogant demeanor led to a widespread popular insurrection led by middle-class intellectuals, professionals, and junior army officers. School teacher María Chinchilla Recinos' death during a peaceful demonstration on 25 June 1944 sparked an outcry that led to Ubico's resignation on 1 July 1944, amidst a general strike and nationwide protests. Initially, he had planned to hand over power to the former director of police, General Roderico Anzueto, whom he felt could control. But his advisors recognized that Anzueto's pro-Nazi sympathies had made him very unpopular, and that he would not be able to control the military. Instead, Ubico chose to select a triumvirate composed of Major General Buenaventura Piñeda, Major General Eduardo Villagrán Ariza, and General Federico Ponce Vaides.

The three generals promised to convene the national assembly to hold an election for a provisional president, but when congress met on 3 July, soldiers held everyone at gunpoint and forced them to vote for General Ponce, rather than the popular civilian candidate Ramón Calderón. Ponce, who had previously retired from military service due to alcoholism, took orders from Ubico and kept many of the officials who had worked in the Ubico administration. The repressive policies of the Ubico administration continued.

Revolution and overthrow
Opposition groups began organizing again, this time joined by many prominent political and military leaders who deemed the Ponce regime unconstitutional.  Among the military officers in the opposition were Jacobo Árbenz Guzmán and Major Francisco Javier Arana. Ubico had fired Árbenz from his teaching post at the Escuela Politécnica (Politechnic School), and since then Árbenz had been in El Salvador organizing a band of revolutionary exiles. On 19 October 1944, a small group of soldiers and students led by Árbenz and Arana attacked the National Palace, in what later became known as the "October Revolution". Ponce was defeated and driven into exile. Árbenz, Arana, and a lawyer named Jorge Toriello established a junta which held democratic elections before the end of the year, and were won by a professor named Juan José Arévalo.

Exile and death
Ubico went into exile to New Orleans in the United States and died of lung cancer on 14 June 1946.

Gallery

See also

History of Guatemala
Obelisco (Guatemala City)
Guatemalan Revolution
President of Guatemala
German cruiser Emden

Notes and references

Notes

References

Bibliography

Further reading
 
 
 
 
 

Presidents of Guatemala
Vice presidents of Guatemala
World War II political leaders
1878 births
1946 deaths
People from Guatemala City
Liberal Party (Guatemala) politicians
Guatemalan exiles
Guatemalan expatriates in the United States
20th-century Guatemalan people
Guatemalan anti-communists
Guatemalan generals